Madison Square Presbyterian Church (demolished 1919) was a Presbyterian church in Manhattan, New York City, located on Madison Square Park at the northeast corner of East 24th Street and Madison Avenue. It was designed by Stanford White in a High Renaissance architectural style, with a prominent central dome over a cubical central space in an abbreviated Greek cross plan; it was built in 1906. The inaugural service was on October 14 of that year. The congregation's church had previously been located on the opposing, southeast corner of Madison and 24th Street, in a Gothic-style structure, also called the "Madison Square Presbyterian Church", whose cornerstone was laid in 1853 and which was completed the following year. Metropolitan Life Insurance Company purchased the original site for the construction of the Metropolitan Life Insurance Company Tower, a 48-story building completed in 1909 which was the world's tallest building when it was constructed.

Architecture

The new church, valued at $500,000 and called the "Parkhurst Church" after its pastor, Reverend Charles Henry Parkhurst, was described as "one of the most costly religious edifices in the city"; it was awarded the Gold Medal of Honor of the American Institute of Architects. To hold its own with the towering commercial blocks surrounding it, both built and to come, its entrance was through a portico supported by six pale green granite columns, fully 30 feet tall.

The building was raised on a marble plinth and built of specially molded bricks in two slightly varied tonalities in a diaper pattern and white and colored architectural terracotta details. It featured a low saucer dome covered in yellow and green tiling, with a prominent gilded lantern. The pediment sculptures by the German-born Adolph Alexander Weinman were tinted by the painter Henry Siddons Mowbray, giving the building a polychromy unusual in American Beaux-Arts architecture. Extensive mosaics and Guastavino tile gave the interior a Byzantine aspect,

The building's architectural style was described by a member of the firm in 1930 as "the Early Christian, with plan in the shape of the Greek cross, like the early Byzantine churches" though a modern viewer would find closer parallels in High Renaissance centrally planned churches of the 16th century, or Andrea Palladio's Tempietto at the Villa Barbaro at Maser.

Demolition

While the church's original stained glass windows, organ and seating had been removed and transferred to the Old First Presbyterian Church, and the pediment with its sculptures was re-erected on the south-facing Park façade of McKim, Mead, and White's Metropolitan Museum of Art, the other architectural details were left to be scavenged by the wrecking company that razed the building. The pale green granite columns, pilasters, pediment, and some windows and doors were reused during the construction of the Hartford Times Building in Hartford, Conn. (1920)  The stained glass windows were repurposed for the St. Francis wedding chapel at The Mission Inn Hotel & Spa in Riverside, CA. The New York Times described the building as having "long been recognized as one of the masterpieces of the late Stanford White" and called the church's destruction "a distinct architectural loss to the city".

The 24th Street site was demolished starting in May 1919 to make way for an 18-story annex building that Metropolitan Life constructed at a cost of $1 million, which connected to a previously built 16-story annex on the north side of the street. The earlier annex was connect to the Metropolitan Life Tower by a bridge over 24th Street. A decade later the annex buildings were leveled, and the entire block bounded by 24th Street, 25th Street, Madison Avenue and Park Avenue South became the site of the Metropolitan Life North Building, still extant, which was designed to accommodate a building as high as 80 stories, of which only 30 were constructed.

References
Notes

Bibliography
Kendall, William Mitchell in Hoak, Edward Warren and Church, Willis Humphrey eds. (1930, reprinted 2002) Masterpieces of American Architecture: Museums, Libraries, Churches and Other Public Buildings, p. 105

Former churches in New York City
Churches completed in 1906
20th-century Presbyterian church buildings in the United States
1919 disestablishments in New York (state)
Italianate architecture in New York City
Closed churches in New York City
Demolished churches in New York City
Demolished buildings and structures in Manhattan
Former Presbyterian churches in New York City
Madison Avenue
Buildings and structures demolished in 1919
1906 establishments in New York City
Beaux-Arts architecture in New York City
Italianate church buildings in the United States